The Meadows Foundation of Somerset County, New Jersey is a nonprofit corporation founded in 1978. It oversaw the restoration of seven historic houses in Somerset.

Houses
 Van Liew-Suydam House, 280 South Middlebush Road. It was built in  the 18th century by Peter Van Liew. Joseph Suydam later built the part of the house that is visible today. The newest and largest portion of the house was built in 1875. Although the most recent long term owner of the house was named French, the house has been named after its two initial owners.
 Van Wickle House, 1289 Easton Avenue. The house, also known as the Meadows, was added to the National Register of Historic Places on December 4, 1973.
 Tulipwood, 1165 Hamilton Street. The house was added to the National Register of Historic Places on September 9, 2005.
 Hageman Farm, 209 South Middlebush Road
 Wyckoff-Garretson House, 215 South Middlebush Road
 Franklin Inn, 2371 Amwell Road. Historically known as the Van Liew Farmhouse.
 Blackwells Mills Canal House, Blackwells Mills Road & Canal Road.  The Bridge Tender's house is a contributing property of the Delaware and Raritan Canal historic district, added to the National Register of Historic Places on May 11, 1973.

See also
Monmouth County Historical Association
New Bridge Landing
Road Up Raritan Historic District

External links

 Official Website
 National Register for Somerset County
 Meadows Foundation leases

 
Houses in Somerset County, New Jersey
Organizations established in 1978
1978 establishments in New Jersey